Miss Grand Korea is a lower concept of Miss Grand International that is held annually as a national female beauty pageant in Korea since 2020. This pageant is to select the representative for Korea to Miss Grand International, which is a pageant promoting World Peace and is against all violent conflicts.

The current Miss Grand Korea titleholder is Lee Ji-ho of Seoul. Lee was crowned Miss Grand Korea on October 22, 2021.

History

Background
From 2013 to 2015, the representative for Korea at Miss Grand International was determined by appointing Korean-Canadians that competed in the Miss Earth Canada contest. Later in 2016, the 1L2H Company chaired by South Korean businessman Hyun Dae-Gon franchised the license for Miss Grand International in Korea. The 2016 titleholder was appointed with the first contest being held the following year 2017. In 2020, the marriage bureau company, Purples, and the Korea Premium Brand Association (KPBA), with Kim Ho-Seong as the president, purchased the Korean license for Miss Grand International and held the contest later that year with it airing on OBS Gyeongin TV. There was a lawsuit between KPBA and the 1L2H Company about the use of the brand name for Miss Grand Korea, but the court rejected all the arguments from both sides since the court considered the brand Miss Grand International belongs to the CEO of Miss Grand International, Nawatt. The court arbitrated that the name Miss Grand Korea could be confusing to participants, so only those with a current license should use the brand name. The old organization changed its pageant name to Miss Glorize Korea in 2020.

Editions
The following list details of the every Miss Grand Korea contest since the first one in 2020.

Titleholders

See also

Miss Grand International
 Miss Korea
 Miss Queen Korea
 Mister World Korea
 Mister International Korea

References

External links
 Miss Grand Korea Official website
 Miss Grand Korea on YouTube

Korea
Recurring events established in 2016
Grand Korea
2016 establishments in South Korea